Charles Henry Ross (1835 – 12 October 1897) was an English writer and cartoonist.

Biography
Ross created the fictional character Ally Sloper for the British magazine Judy in 1867, the popular character was spun off into his own comic, Ally Sloper's Half Holiday, in 1884. Ross originally was the illustrator of the character until his French-born wife, under the pseudonym Marie Duval, later took over the illustration. He had a son, Charles.

For a number of years, Ross was the editor of Judy.

He contributed a series of engravings, entitled "A Happy Day in a Varlet's Life. In a Series of Hard Lines", to the Ninth Season (1868) of Beeton's Christmas Annual.

Ross was the author of six novels in genres ranging from Gothic penny dreadfuls to light romances.

He died on 12 October 1897 in Clapham, London.

Works 
 The Book of Cats (1868)

References

External links
 
 
 

English writers
1835 births
1897 deaths